Gus Worland is an Australian television and radio personality. He worked on Triple M breakfast radio from 2009 to 2019 and a series of reality television programs Man Up on the ABC, An Aussie Goes Barmy, An Aussie Goes Bolly and An Aussie Goes Calypso which aired on Fox8.

Early life
Worland grew up in Sydney, Australia. He attended Knox Grammar School, where he met lifelong friend Hugh Jackman. During his schooling, Worland played a number of sports and was heavily involved with the extracurricular activities at Knox Grammar School. After graduating from high school, he worked in sales with Toshiba. After marrying wife Vicky in England, they returned to Australia and later had three children and Gus' media career began. Gus graduated from Knox with honours.

Media career

Television
With Hugh Jackman, Worland co-created and starred in Fox8's An Aussie Goes series, following the Australian cricket team around the world. The first series in 2006 was An Aussie Goes Barmy. His mission was to follow the Barmy Army from England to Australia for all five cricket test matches. The next series was An Aussie Goes Bolly in India. The third series brought Worland to the West Indies for An Aussie Goes Calypso. Worland had a program on A&E Australia called Gus Worland: Marathon Man. Together with Julia Morris he hosted The Singing Office which won an ASTRA Award for Best Entertainment Program that year.

Radio
Gus spent 10 years in breakfast radio on Triple M. Starting on The Grill Team in 2009. Gus was awarded 'Best on Air Newcomer' at the 2010 Australian Commercial Radio Awards. The Grill Team changed to Moon Man in the Morning in 2019. In 2020, Gus joined The Deadset Legends with Jude Bolton and Wendell Sailor live each Saturday morning on Triple M.

Gus is also a regular contributor on The Today Show, often appearing alongside Government Services Minister Bill Shorten.

Charity – Gotcha4Life 
Gus founded Gotcha4Life in 2017, following the success of the ABC series Man Up.

Awards
Worland has won two ASTRA Awards: one for Best Entertainment Show in 2007 for his role as Team Leader in Fox8's The Singing Office and the second in 2008 when he was awarded Best Sports Show on Pay TV for An Aussie Goes Bolly. Worland was recognised as the Best Newcomer On-Air in the Metropolitan Division at the 2010 Australian Commercial Radio Awards. Gus has won the Best Documentary on Australian Radio twice, in 2015 and 2019.

References

External links
 Gus Worland – Harry M Miller Group
 Gotcha4Life
 

Living people
Triple M presenters
Australian television presenters
Year of birth missing (living people)
People educated at Knox Grammar School